Rhys Ford is an author of LGBT mysteries, urban fantasy, thrillers, and contemporary fiction. She was nominated for a Lambda Literary Award for Gay Fiction for her novel Murder and Mayhem in 2016 and for Tramps and Thieves in 2018.

Her first novel, Dirty Kiss was published by Dreamspinner Press in July 2011.

Published works

The Dirty Series aka Cole McGinnis Series

McGinnis Investigations Series

Sinners Series

415 Ink Series

Kai Gracen Series

Half Moon Bay Series

Murder and Mayhem Series

Hellsinger Series

Ramen Assassin Series

Wayward Wolves Series

Stand Alone Novels, Novellas, Collaborations

Awards
 2013 Library Journal, Best Ebooks Romance, Black Dog Blues, Won
 28th Lambda Literary Awards, Gay Mystery, Murder and Mayhem, Finalist.
 2017 Paranormal Romance Guild Award Winner
 30th Lambda Literary Awards, Gay Mystery, Tramps and Thieves, Finalist.
 2018 Paranormal Romance Guild Award Winner

References 

Year of birth missing (living people)
Living people
American LGBT novelists
American women novelists
21st-century American novelists
21st-century American women writers
American mystery novelists
American thriller writers
American fantasy writers
Writers from Hawaii